"Coda" is the eighth episode and mid-season finale of the fifth season of the post-apocalyptic horror television series The Walking Dead, which aired on AMC on November 30, 2014. The episode marks Lennie James's second uncredited post-credits appearance in the fifth season as Morgan Jones. The episode was written by Angela Kang and directed by Ernest Dickerson.

The episode primarily takes place in and around Grady Memorial Hospital in Atlanta, where Beth Greene finds herself as Dawn Lerner's ward, discovering her past and finding herself endangered by Officer O'Donnell. Meanwhile, Rick Grimes hunts down Officer Lamson, who has escaped. Father Gabriel Stokes also finds himself chased by walkers as Michonne and Carl Grimes reunite with the returning group, including Beth's sister Maggie Greene, who is informed of her sister's whereabouts. Rick and the others then attempt to arrange a hostage exchange for Beth.

The term "coda" is a musical term which refers to a concluding musical section that is formally distinct from the main structure. The episode title refers to Beth, the only character associated with music. The episode received mixed reviews from television commentators, with many praising aspects such as the opening, but others commenting that the climax is nonsensical or underwhelming. Others praised the performances of Norman Reedus, and Lauren Cohan, as well as the direction of Ernest Dickerson.

Plot
Rick chases down Lamson in a police car after Lamson's escape from Sasha. Lamson ignores Rick's warnings to stop, so Rick hits him with the car. A crippled Lamson pleads to be taken to the hospital, however Rick executes him on the spot with his revolver. Fearing that Lamson's death will result in violence between Rick's group and Dawn's crew, Rick and officers Shepherd and Licari, the other two captured cops from GMH that were captured along with Lamson, agree to concoct a story that Lamson was killed by walkers. Meanwhile at the hospital, order starts to break down when the officers fail to recapture Noah or report in, and others soon begin to lose faith in Dawn's leadership.

After fleeing the church, Gabriel reaches the school where The Hunters had set up camp. He discovers the remnants of Bob's leg. Walkers break out of the school and chase Gabriel back to the church, where he is cornered against the fortified front door and experiences the fear of his parishioners. Hearing Gabriel's screams for help, Carl and Michonne break down the front door, allowing Gabriel inside but they are then overwhelmed with walkers and are forced to retreat to the rectory. Once there, Gabriel holds off the walkers while Carl, Michonne and Judith escape through the hole Gabriel had made previously in the floor of his office, then follows himself; they reseal the front doors, trapping the walkers inside. Just as the walkers are about to break through the door, Abraham's group arrives in the fire truck, bringing the news that Eugene's mission was a lie. Michonne informs Maggie they know where Beth is, and they head to Atlanta.

O'Donnell confronts Dawn after overhearing her talk to Beth about how she covered up Beth's involvement in Gorman's death. He threatens to remove her as leader. The two get into a fight, resulting in O'Donnell's death when Beth pushes him down the elevator shaft. Beth later accuses Dawn of manipulating her into eliminating Gorman and O'Donnell, who were threats to Dawn's position, and again vows to escape. Dawn denies the accusation and promises to remember Beth's support. During their conversation, Carol begins to wake up.

Meanwhile, Rick meets up with another pair of officers and proposes to trade Shepherd and Licari for Beth and Carol. They agree, and Rick's group meets Dawn and her officers at the hospital. As Beth packs up, she hides a pair of scissors in her cast. The trade initially goes smoothly, but Dawn adds a condition at the last second, demanding Rick hand over Noah, her former ward, to replace Beth, her new ward. Rick and Beth are reluctant, but Noah agrees so as to prevent bloodshed. Beth goes to give him a hug, but as she does so, Dawn makes a gloating comment in reference to her earlier conversation with Beth. Angered, Beth faces Dawn and icily tells her, "I get it now." With that, Beth stabs Dawn's shoulder with the scissors. Caught off guard, Dawn reflexively fires her pistol into Beth's head, killing her instantly. Despite Dawn's own shock and pleas for mercy, an enraged Daryl immediately pulls out his own pistol and shoots her in the head, killing her. The resulting stand-off is defused by Shepherd, who tells the remaining officers to hold their fire. She insists that Dawn was the problem all along, and that it is all over now that she is dead. Edwards offers to let Rick and his group stay at the hospital, but Rick declines. Instead, he offers anyone in the hospital who wants to leave to join his group, but only Noah accepts. As they exit the hospital, they encounter the rest of the group. Maggie collapses in agony when she sees Daryl carrying Beth's body.

In a post-credits scene, Morgan continues to follow Gareth's marks on the trees, coming across the school and later the church, where he makes an offering and laughs. As he explores, he finds the map and written note Abraham had left for Rick, which has Rick's full name written on it. He is shocked to learn that he is following Rick's trail.

Production

Scott Gimple confirmed the opening sequence — in which Rick chases down Lamson — is an homage to the comic book series in which similar events take place over the Prison-Woodbury conflict with Caesar Martinez, the loyal second-in-command to The Governor.

Reception
Upon airing, the episode was watched by 14.807 million American viewers with an 18-49 rating of 7.6, an increase in viewership from the previous week which had 13.33 million viewers and an 18-49 rating of 7.0. In Australia, it received 0.080 million viewers, making it the highest-rated cable broadcast that day. In the United Kingdom, it garnered 0.885 million viewers, making it the most-watched broadcast that week.

The episode garnered mixed reviews from critics, with many praising the opening sequence and ending. IGN's Matt Fowler, who gave a lukewarm review of the episode, said that though Beth's death was predictable, it "felt like a big moment and it's always wrenching to see other characters react to the death of their loved ones. I liked Beth, but I still mostly felt bad about her death because Daryl and Maggie (who seemed to have to be reminded this week that Beth being gone at all was a topic she should care about) felt bad about it." Fowler ultimately gave the episode a 7.6 out of 10.

Laura Prudom of Variety commented positively on the episode's ending and praised the performances of Lauren Cohan (as Maggie Greene) and Norman Reedus (as Daryl Dixon), saying: "The episode’s final few moments did prove to be some of the series’ most powerful yet — both Lauren Cohan and Norman Reedus gave truly gut-wrenching performances after Beth’s death, and it was heartbreaking to see Maggie’s rapid transition from elation at learning her sister was alive to utter devastation at seeing her dead over the course of twenty minutes."

Zack Handlen of The A.V. Club gave the episode a B− grade, saying that the finale "reminds us that, whatever else it’s learned, the show still hasn't given up on its most beloved trick: killing people because it can. Beth's sudden death was a shock, no question, although I imagine some viewers were expecting just such a gut-punch. There were signs. [...] The result is a deflating conclusion to what had been a promising start."

Dalton Ross of Entertainment Weekly said of the episode as a whole "I've already gone on record as really liking season 5, but it needed a strong eighth episode to keep that momentum going and get people excited for the back half to air in 2015. The show has always delivered on its midseason finales — especially with the Barnageddon massacre (R.I.P. Sophia) of season 2 and last year’s beheading of Hershel — and while this year’s installment may not have equaled either of those examples in terms of pure shock value, it was an emotional and effective hour of television nonetheless."

Kelsea Stahler of Bustle felt that killing Dawn wasted "a perfectly good season 5 villain", which represented a "missed opportunity" to have a female character be the "big bad" and to have the narrative for the rest of the season be based on a conflict between two women (Dawn and Beth). Rob Bricken of io9, in addition to calling the plot one of the "worst of season 5" and the story "more laughable than moving", also criticised the deaths of Dawn and Beth as a "wasted opportunity". He cited the "childish, ridiculous logic" Dawn had for demanding Noah back even though she had "zero leverage" and Beth's "inexplicable, dumb decision" to stab Dawn in the shoulder.

References

External links

"Coda" at AMC

2014 American television episodes
The Walking Dead (season 5) episodes
Television episodes directed by Ernest Dickerson